Caldicot School is a coeducational and non-selective secondary school in Caldicot, Monmouthshire, South Wales, with around 1,400 students. In 2013, the school was rated 'Good' by Estyn. At the time of the inspection in November 2013, 11% of pupils were eligible for free school meals against the national average of 17.7%.

History

1958-1968 
Caldicot School (formally Caldicot Community College) welcomed its first intake of pupils on the 1st of September 1958. The College opened with 19 teachers and room to accommodate 400 students in a three-story building, to the west of the school's site. This building later became known as Grayhill Building, named after Grayhill.

1969-1974 
On the 3rd of September 1969 the school became comprehensive and changed its name to Caldicot Comprehensive School. To accommodate more pupils, a new four storey block was opened that could accommodate a further 600 pupils. It housed a canteen, gymnasium, 20 classrooms and a science block. This building was originally known as Upper School, until a further block was built in 1973 making it known as Middle School and then later becoming known as Castle School, named after Caldicot Castle. 

In 1973 a third block was built, known originally as Upper School, later becoming called Deepweir, named after the Deepweir area of Caldicot. The three storey building was at the eastern end of the school's site and housed the sixth form.

In 1974 Mr. W.A. Silk retired due to ill health. Mr. Eric Blackaby became acting Head Teacher.

1975-1980 
In 1975 Mr. C.A. Vanloo became Head Teacher.

1981-2001 
In 1981 Mr. J. Norwood became Head Teacher.

The school celebrated its 25th anniversary in 1985 and had 1650 pupils and 99 staff at the time.

In December 2001 Mr. J. Norwood announced he would retire as Head Teacher at the end of the academic year after 22 years' service to the school.

2002-present day 
A £2 million science block was opened in July 2002 which housed four laboratories. The block was connected to the science block in Castle School building.

In September 2002 Mrs. S. Gwyer-Roberts became Head Teacher after the retirement of Mr. J. Norwood.

By the 2000s the school's four teaching buildings were becoming dilapidated and unfit for purpose so a new building was planned. The new build was a result of the Welsh Government's 21st Century Schools & Education Capital Programme. It was scheduled to cost £31million, which then rose to £34.9 million, but at the time of completion it was said to have cost a total of £36.5 million.

In February 2014 a plan to sell four acres of the school's playing field was approved to supermarket chain ASDA, generating £4 million towards the building of the new school. The rest of the money needed for the new build was paid for by Monmouthsire County Council and the Welsh Government.

In early 2016 the Technology Department's building, the 'Tech Block' along with the 'Learning Centre' were knocked down to make-way for the new build. Until the new build's completion, the Technology Department and Learning Centre were housed in temporary buildings on the school's site.

On Monday 11 September 2017 the new build opened. The three floor new building has capacity for 1,500 students and houses all subject departments under one roof, as opposed to the previous four main blocks which served the school.

Curriculum

Key Stage 3 
In KS3 all students follow the National Curriculum. The KS3 programme of study includes: English, Mathematics, Science, Welsh, Art, Drama, Geography, History, Information & Communication Technology (ICT), Modern Foreign Languages (French and Spanish), Music, Physical Education, Personal & Social Education (PSE), Religious Education and Design & Technology.

Key Stage 4 
In KS4 pupils must follow the core National Curriculum of English, Mathematics, Science (with the option of separate sciences leading to 3 GCSEs), Welsh Second Language (full course), Religious Education (short course with the option to study the full, course as an option), Physical Education, PSE and the Welsh Baccalaureate Qualification.  In addition pupils must choose three option subjects. A variety of options are available which include some vocation courses.

Key Stage 5 
In KS5 pupils chose between studying two, three or four subjects to study to 'A' Level in addition to the Advance Welsh Baccalaureate qualification.

Welsh language 
Although Caldicot School is an English medium school, all pupils must learn Welsh until KS4 in accordance with the Welsh Language Act 1993. Welsh is taught as a second language. According to the school's 2013 Estyn report, 'Very few pupils speak Welsh as their first language.' The report also mentioned 'in Welsh second language, standards and teaching are very good'.

The school started teaching Welsh in 1996 after the Welsh Office ended a dispensation that exempted three comprehensive schools in Monmouthshire to teach Welsh. Until 2017 when the GCSE short course Welsh Second Language qualification was scrapped, Caldicot School was the only school in Monmouthshire to make the full course compulsory to all pupils and had done since September 2008.

The school has a bilingualism policy which supports the role of incidental Welsh within the school and makes sure Welsh is available at A Level.

School performance

2013 Estyn inspection 
The school's most recent Estyn inspection took place in 2013 and placed it as 'Good' in every category. The report said that 'in Welsh second language, standards and teaching are very good'. This was a succession from the school's 2007 inspection which also placed it as 'Good'.

Welsh Government Banding 
In 2014, 2015 and 2016, the school was placed in the 'Yellow Band' of the Welsh Government's education banding system. In 2014 and 2015, the school's improvement capacity was graded a Grade B but in 2016, it was graded a Grade A.

GCSE Results 
In 2016 69.7% of pupils achieved the Level 2 threshold, which is the volume of qualifications equivalent to the volume of 5 GCSEs at Grade A*-C including one in English and one in Mathematics.

A Level Results 
In 2016 and 2017, 100% of pupils achieved the Level 3 threshold which is the number of qualifications equivalent to the volume of 2 A levels grades A-E.

Extracurricular activities 
The school offers a variety of extracurricular activities ranging from a Welsh club to a judo club. The Estyn 2013 inspection report stated that 'pupils participate in a wide-variety of extra curricular activities within school and in the local community, such as the Caldicot food bank and raising money for Ty Hafan'.

Every year, the Welsh department students celebrates St. David's Day by holding an Eisteddfod for Year 7 pupils; 'A' Level Welsh pupils help to arrange the Eisteddfod.

Uniform 
In September 2015, a new uniform with a new school logo was introduced for pupils in Years 7 to 11.  KS3 & KS4 pupils are expected to a wear full school uniform which consists of a black blazer, with an embroidered school badge, a white shirt, school tie and black formal trousers. The girls are also allowed to wear a black knee length skirt.

In September 2015, a business-style dress code was introduced for the Sixth Form.

Notable former staff members 
 Brian Price - physical education teacher
 John Nettleship - chemistry teacher
 Mark Labbett - maths teacher
 Rhys Edwards - physical education teacher
 Brynmor Williams - physical education teacher

Notable former pupils

References

External links
School website
Monmouthshire County Council Education website

Secondary schools in Monmouthshire
School